Mornay Jan Jakobus Smith (born 30 January 1998) is a South African rugby union player for the  in the United Rugby Championship and the  in the Currie Cup. His regular position is tighthead prop.

Rugby career

Youth rugby

Smith was born in Pretoria. He went to Hoërskool Eldoraigne, where he played rugby for the first team. He was included in the ' Craven Week team in 2016, and also earned a selection to the South Africa Schools 'A' squad, playing in matches against Italy, England and Wales in the 2016 Under-19 International Series.

Senior career

Honours
 Currie Cup winner 2020–21, 2021
 Pro14 Rainbow Cup runner-up 2021
 United Rugby Championship runner-up 2021-22

References

South African rugby union players
Living people
1998 births
Rugby union players from Pretoria
Rugby union props
Blue Bulls players
Bulls (rugby union) players